The 2022 Australia Cup was the ninth season of the Australia Cup, the main national soccer knockout cup competition in Australia. This edition was the first under the new name of the "Australia Cup" following the renaming of Football Federation Australia to Football Australia. Thirty-two teams contested the competition proper.

Melbourne Victory were the defending champions but were eliminated by Western United in the Round of 32. Macarthur FC won the first trophy in their history after defeating Sydney United 58 in the final. Sydney United 58 was the first member federation club to qualify for the Australia Cup final.

This edition was the first whose winners qualified for the AFC Cup.

Round and dates

Teams
A total of 32 teams will participate in the 2022 Australia Cup competition proper.

A-League Men clubs represent the highest level in the Australian league system, whereas Member Federation clubs come from level 2 and below.

Prize fund
The prize fund has been unchanged since 2015, though this is the first year the winner will also benefit from participating in the 2023-24 AFC Cup.

Preliminary rounds

Member federation teams are competing in various state-based preliminary rounds to win one of 22 places in the competition proper (at the Round of 32). All Australian clubs are eligible to enter the qualifying process through their respective member federation; however, only one team per club is permitted entry into the competition. The preliminary rounds operate within a consistent national structure whereby club entry into the competition is staggered in each state/territory, determined by what level the club sits at in the Australian soccer league system. This ultimately leads to round 7 with the winning clubs from that round entering directly into the round of 32.

As there was no NPL Champion in the previous year, an additional slot was allocated to Victoria for this edition only.

Additionally, the top eight placed A-League Men clubs for the 2021–22 A-League Men season gained automatic qualification to the Round of 32. The remaining four teams entered a play-off series to determine the remaining two positions.

Bracket

Round of 32
The round of 32 draw took place on 29 June 2022. The lowest ranked side that qualified for this round was Wollongong United. They were the only level 6 team left in the competition.

Times are AEST (UTC+10), as listed by Football Australia (local times, if different, are in parentheses).

Round of 16
The round of 16 draw took place on 3 August 2022. The lowest ranked side that qualified for this round was Modbury Jets. They were the only level 3 team left in the competition.

Times are AEST (UTC+10), as listed by Football Australia (local times, if different, are in parentheses).

Quarter-finals
The quarter-finals draw took place on 17 August 2022. The lowest ranked sides that qualified for this round were Oakleigh Cannons, Peninsula Power and Sydney United 58. They were the only level 2 teams left in the competition.

Times are AEST (UTC+10), as listed by Football Australia (local times, if different, are in parentheses).

Semi-finals
The semi-finals draw took place on 31 August 2022. The lowest ranked sides that qualified for this round were Oakleigh Cannons and Sydney United 58. They were the only level 2 teams left in the competition.

Final

Top goalscorers

Note Goals scored in preliminary rounds not included.

Broadcasting rights
Matches were broadcast through 10 Play and the final was shown live on Network 10.

References

External links
Official website

Australia
2022 in Australian soccer
Australia Cup seasons